Linha do Algarve  is a railway line in the region of Algarve, in southern Portugal, which connects the stations of Lagos to the west and Vila Real de Santo António to the east of the Portuguese region.

Geography 
The line runs east to west along the southern municipalities of the Algarve, except for part of Lagos municipality and all of Vila do Bispo municipality which doesn't have railway. The main stations are Vila Real de Santo António, Tavira, Olhão, Faro, Albufeira, Tunes, Silves, Portimão and Lagos. Other stations include Fuseta, Bom João (Faro), Almancil, Algoz and Estômbar.

Operation

Passengers and cargo 
All passenger services are run by the national railway operator Comboios de Portugal. Cargo services are operated by Medway. The infrastructure is owned and maintained by Infraestruturas de Portugal. The main railway station is Faro, the most important cargo terminal is Loulé.

Four passenger services operate on the Linha do Algarve. The Alfa Pendular, Intercidades, CP Regional, and a special service during the summer the InterRegional. The CP Regional trains operate the line completely from east to west with an interchange at Faro. The Alfa Pendular, Intercidades and InterRegional only service Messines-Alte, Tunes, Albufeira, Loulé, and Faro.

The track from Vila Real de Santo António to Vila Real de Santo António - Guadiana, which linked the line to the ferries to Ayamonte, in Spain, is closed.

History 

In 1858, the expansion of the Linha do Sul, today Linha do Alentejo, from Beja to Algarve was planned; in 1864, the contract between Companhia dos Caminhos de Ferro de Sul e Sueste and the Portuguese state was signed.

The connection to Faro was completed on 21 February 1889, but only opened on 1 July of the same year.

The railway reached Olhão on 28 March 1904 (although the station was only opened on 15 May of that year), Fuseta railway station on 1 September, Luz on 31 January 1905, Tavira on 19 March, and Vila Real de Santo António on 14 April 1906. Towards Lagos, the stations of Algoz, Ferragudo and Lagos were opened on 10 October 1889, 15 February 1903 and 30 July 1922. The Vila Real de Santo António – Guadiana station was opened in the 1940s.

See also 
 List of railway lines in Portugal
 List of Portuguese locomotives and railcars
 History of rail transport in Portugal

References

Bibliography 
 
 
 
 

 
Alg
Iberian gauge railways
Railway lines opened in 1889